Adam Lindsay Gordon (19 October 1833 – 24 June 1870) was a British-Australian poet, horseman, police officer and politician. He was the first Australian poet to gain considerable recognition overseas, and according to his contemporary, writer Marcus Clarke, Gordon's work represented "the beginnings of a national school of Australian poetry".

Early life 
Though commonly cited as having been born in Fayal in the Azores, where Captain Gordon had brought his wife for the sake of her health, Gordon's birthplace was the small English village of Charlton Kings near Cheltenham, where he was baptised. He was the son of Captain Adam Durnford Gordon and Harriet Gordon, his first cousin, both of whom were descended from Adam Gordon of Auchindoun, of the ballad "Edom o Gordon". Captain Gordon had retired from the Bengal cavalry and taught Hindustani. His mother's family had owned slaves in the British West Indies until the abolition of slavery in the 1830s, and had received significant financial compensation for the loss of their property. Gordon would in 1859 inherit some £7,000 from his mother's estate.

Gordon was sent to Cheltenham College in 1841, when he was only seven, but after he had been there a year, he was sent to a school kept by the Rev. Samuel Ollis Garrard in Gloucestershire. He attended the Royal Military Academy, Woolwich, in 1848, where he was a contemporary and friend of Charles George Gordon (no relation, later Gordon of Khartoum) and Thomas Bland Strange (later known as Gunner Jingo). There, Gordon appears to have been good at sports, but not studious and certainly undisciplined, and like Richard Henry Horne, he was asked to leave. Gordon was again admitted a pupil at Cheltenham College. He was not there for long; he appears to have left in the middle of 1852, but the story that he was expelled from Cheltenham is without foundation. Then, Gordon was sent to the Royal Grammar School Worcester in 1852. Gordon began to lead a wild and aimless life, contracted debts, and was a great anxiety to his father, who at last decided that his son should go to Australia and make a fresh start in 1853 to join the mounted police with a letter of introduction to the governor.

Gordon had fallen in love with Jane Bridges, a girl, aged 17 who was able to tell the story 60 years afterwards to his biographers. Gordon did not declare his love until he came to say good-bye to her before leaving for Australia on 7 August 1853. "With characteristic recklessness, he offered to sacrifice the passage he had taken to Australia, and all his father's plans for giving him a fresh start in life, if she would tell him not to go, or promise to be his wife, or even give him some hope." This she could not do, though she liked the shy, handsome boy and remembered him with affection to the end of a long life. It was the one romance of Gordon's life.

That Gordon realised his conduct had fallen much below what it might have been can be seen in his poems ... "To my Sister", written three days before he left England, and "Early Adieux", evidently written about the same time.

To Australia 

Gordon was just over 20 years old when he arrived in Adelaide on 14 November 1853. He immediately obtained a position in the South Australian mounted police and was stationed at Mount Gambier and Penola. Adam Lindsay Gordon also acted as groom for a period to senior South Australian Police Officer Alexander Tolmer. On 4 November 1855, he resigned from the force and took up horse-breaking in the south-eastern district of South Australia. The interest in horse-racing, which he had shown as a youth in England, was continued in Australia, and in a letter written in November 1854, he mentioned that he had a horse for the steeplechase at the next meeting. In 1857, he met the Rev. Julian Tenison Woods, who lent him books and talked poetry with him. He then had the reputation of being "a good steady lad and a splendid horseman". In this year, his father died and he also lost his mother about two years later. From her estate, he received £6944–18–1 on 26 October 1861. He was making a reputation as a rider over hurdles, and several times either won or was placed in local hurdle races and steeplechases.

On 6 August 1859, the ship Admella ran aground on the Cape Northumberland shoals, not a great distance from where Gordon is known to have been staying. The ship broke up, many perished (see main article), and many heroic feats were attempted, including an epic horse ride to Mount Gambier to summon help. Some 10 years later, Gordon wrote a poem "From the Wreck", probably inspired by this story, but somehow the popular imagination put Gordon in that saddle, and a number of newspaper articles were written to debunk the myth.

On 20 October 1862, he married Margaret Park, then a girl of 17. In March 1864, Gordon bought a cottage, Dingley Dell, near Port MacDonnell, and in this same year, inspired by six engravings after Noel Paton illustrating "The Dowie Dens O' Yarrow", Gordon wrote a poem "The Feud", of which 30 copies were printed at Mount Gambier.

In July 1864, Gordon performed the daring riding feat known as Gordon's Leap on the edge of the Blue Lake. A commemorative obelisk erected there has an inscription which reads: "This obelisk was erected as a memorial to the famous Australian poet. From near this spot in July, 1864, Gordon made his famed leap on horseback over an old post and rail guard fence onto a narrow ledge overlooking the Blue Lake and jumped back again onto the roadway. The foundation stone of the Gordon Memorial Obelisk was laid on 8th July 1887.”

On 11 January 1865, he received a deputation asking him to stand for parliament and was elected by three votes to the South Australian House of Assembly on 16 March 1865 for the district of Victoria. In politics, Gordon was a maverick. His semiclassical speeches were colourful and entertaining, but largely irrelevant, and he resigned his seat on 10 November 1866. He found a good friend in wealthy fellow parliamentarian John Riddoch of Penola, and was a frequent guest at his grand residence "Yallum". There he wrote "The Sick Stockrider".

Gordon's time in politics stimulated him to greater activity – poetry, horse racing, and speculation. He was contributing verse to the Australasian and Bell's Life in Victoria and doing a fair amount of riding. He bought some land in Western Australia, but returned from a visit there early in 1867 and went to live at Mount Gambier. On 10 June 1867, he published "Ashtaroth, a Dramatic Lyric", and on the 19th of the same month, "Sea Spray and Smoke Drift".

Move to Victoria 

With his failures behind him, Gordon turned to Victoria, not to Melbourne, which had ignored his poetry, but to Ballarat. In November, he rented Craig's livery stables at Ballarat in partnership with Harry Mount, but he had no head for business and the venture was a failure. In March 1868, he had a serious accident, a horse smashing his head against a gatepost of his own yard. His daughter, born on 3 May 1867, died at the age of 11 months, his financial difficulties were increasing, and he fell into very low spirits. Dna evidence revealed  a possible child of Gordon’s that was adopted by his good friends, however it is possible this child was an illegitimate offspring of a different one of Gordon’s relatives.

In spite of short sight, he was becoming very well known as a gentleman rider, and on 10 October 1868, actually won three races in one day at the Melbourne Hunt Club steeplechase meeting. He rode with great patience and judgment, but his want of good sight was always a handicap. He began riding for money, but was not fortunate and had more than one serious fall. He sold his business and left Ballarat in October 1868 and came to Melbourne, and eventually found lodgings at 10 Lewis Street, Brighton. He had succeeded in straightening his financial affairs and was more cheerful. He made a little money out of his racing and became a member of the Yorick Club, where he was friendly with Marcus Clarke, George Gordon McCrae, and a little later Henry Kendall. On 12 March 1870, Gordon had a bad fall while riding in a steeplechase at Flemington Racecourse. His head was injured and he never completely recovered.

Death 

He had for some time been endeavouring to show that he was heir to the estate of Esslemont in Scotland, but there was a flaw in the entail, and in June, he learnt that his claim must be abandoned. He had seen his last book, Bush Ballads and Galloping Rhymes, through the press, and it was published on 23 June 1870; it was not successful at the time, but is now regarded as one of the most important pieces of Australian literature. Gordon on that day met Kendall, who showed him the proof of the favourable review he had written for the Australasian but Gordon had just asked his publishers what he owed them for printing the book, and realised that he had no money to pay them and no prospects. He went home to his cottage at 10 Lewis Street Brighton carrying a package of cartridges for his rifle. Next morning, he rose early, walked into the tea-tree scrub by the beach, and shot himself.

In October 1870, a monument was erected over his grave at the Brighton General Cemetery by his close friends. His wife went back to South Australia, married Peter Low, and lived until November 1919.

Legacy 

In the decades following Gordon's death, his work continued to draw increasing praise from literary figures and the public at large, and especially in Melbourne, he was exalted as a genius and a national poet. Arthur Conan Doyle and Oscar Wilde counted among his admirers, the latter hailing him as "one of the finest poetic singers the English race has ever known". Gordon's reputation peaked in the 1930s, during which time statues and monuments to his memory were erected throughout Australia and Britain. On 30 October 1932, a statue of Gordon by Paul Montford was unveiled near Parliament House, Melbourne, in a garden now known as Gordon Reserve; and in May 1934, his bust was placed in Poets' Corner, Westminster Abbey, and he remains the only Australian poet commemorated there.

Over time, the praise he received resulted in a backlash. George Bernard Shaw jokes about Gordon's verse in his 1949 play Shakes versus Shav, a dialogue between Shakespeare and himself during which Shakespeare laughs at a line attributed to Gordon. Critics dismissed some of Gordon's poetry as careless and banal, but conceded that, at his best, he is a poet of importance, who on occasions wrote some magnificent lines. Douglas Sladen, a lifelong admirer, in his Adam Lindsay Gordon, The Westminster Abbey Memorial Volume, made a selection of 27 poems that occupy about 90 pages.

Gordon's works have inspired numerous works in other artistic mediums. Australian impressionist painter Arthur Streeton titled some of his works after Gordon's poetry. Film director W. J. Lincoln based two films on poems by Gordon: The Wreck (1913) and The Sick Stockrider (1915). He also directed the 1916 biopic The Life's Romance of Adam Lindsay Gordon, starring Hugh McCrae in the title role. Unlike many other early Australian silent films, much of the film survives today. One of Gordon's poems, "The Swimmer", forms the libretto for the fifth movement of English composer Sir Edward Elgar's song cycle Sea Pictures, and Elgar also set to music another of his poems, "A Song of Autumn". Composer Varney Monk set three of her songs to Gordon's poems.

After a particularly trying year for the British Royal Family, Elizabeth II quoted from one of Gordon's more famous poems in her Christmas Message of 1992, "Kindness in another's trouble, courage in one's own..", but did not mention the poet's name. The same, full poem was also quoted by Diana, Princess of Wales during a speech in Washington, D.C. in 1996. 

Dingley Dell, Gordon's property and home from 1862 to 1866, are preserved as a conservation park and as a museum. The museum houses early volumes of his work, personal effects, and a display of his horse-riding equipment.

In 1970, Gordon was honoured on a postage stamp bearing his portrait issued by Australia Post.

On 20 September 2014, Gordon was inducted in the Australian Jumps Racing Association's Gallery of Champions.

The suburb Gordon in Canberra, Australia's capital, is named after Gordon.

Poetry collections 

 Sea Spray and Smoke Drift (1867)
 Bush Ballads and Galloping Rhymes (1870)
 Poems of the Late Adam Lindsay Gordon (1879)
 Racing Rhymes and Other Verses (1901)

Selected individual works 
 "A Song of Autumn" (1868)
 "The Sick Stockrider" (1870)
 "The Swimmer" (1870)
 Poetry by Adam Lindsay Gordon was set to music by French-Australian musician Theodore Tourrier (1846-1929) in 1904

See also
Australian literature
Yorick Club
The Life's Romance of Adam Lindsay Gordon

References

Further reading
 
 Kramer, Leonie, 'Gordon, Adam Lindsay (1833–1870)', Australian Dictionary of Biography, Volume 4, Melbourne University Press, 1972, pp 267–269. Retrieved on 24 December 2008.

External links 

 
 
 
 The Adam Lindsay Gordon Commemorative Committee
Adam Lindsay Gordon (1833–1870) Gravesite at Brighton General Cemetery (Vic)
 Dingley Dell Cottage and Museum at Port MacDonnell, SA
 Sighs of Sorrow – A song cycle by Xavier Brouwer on the poetry of Adam Lindsay Gordon

Further reading 
 
 Coventry, CJ. "Links in the Chain: British slavery, Victoria and South Australia," 1(1) Before/Now (2019): Links in the Chain: British slavery, Victoria and South Australia
 
 
 Michael Wilding, Wild Bleak Bohemia: Marcus Clarke, Adam Lindsay Gordon and Henry Kendall: A Documentary, Melbourne, Australian Scholarly Publishing 2014

1833 births
1870 deaths
1870s suicides
Australian poets
Australian people of Scottish descent
Australian politicians who committed suicide
People educated at the Royal Grammar School Worcester
Members of the South Australian House of Assembly
Suicides by firearm in Victoria (Australia)
Settlers of South Australia
19th-century poets
19th-century Australian politicians
People from Gloucestershire
British emigrants to colonial Australia